Burke River may refer to:
Burke River (New South Wales), Australia, a tributary of Nepean River
Burke River (Queensland), Australia
Burke River (New Zealand)

also see:
Little Burke River (disambiguation)